Ratnapeeth College (Assamese: ৰত্নপীঠ মহাবিদ্যালয়) is a government college for Arts education in Chapar, Dhubri, Assam, a northeastern state of India. The college campus is considered to be one of the most beautiful college campuses in India. It is a non-residential college.

History

Architecture

Rankings

Notable alumnae

Ratnapeeth College in Television and Film

Sports

References

External links

Universities and colleges in Assam
Educational institutions in India with year of establishment missing